Andrei Dăescu and Florin Mergea were the defending champions but decided not to participate.
Dominik Meffert and Philipp Oswald won the title, defeating Stephan Fransen and Artem Sitak 6–1, 3–6, [14–12] in the final.

Seeds

Draw

Draw

References
 Main Draw

Oberstaufen Cup - Doubles
2013 Doubles